The Sign of the Claw is a 1926 American silent action film directed by B. Reeves Eason and starring Ethel Shannon, Edward Hearn and Lee Shumway. Produced by the independent Gotham Pictures, it was designed as a vehicle for Peter the Great, one of several dog stars to appear in films during the 1920s.

Cast
 Peter the Great as Peter
 Ethel Shannon as Mildred Bryson
 Edward Hearn as 	Robert Conway
 Lee Shumway as Al Stokes
 Joseph Bennett a Jimmie Bryson 
 Carmencita Johnson as Little Girl

References

Bibliography
 Connelly, Robert B. The Silents: Silent Feature Films, 1910-36, Volume 40, Issue 2. December Press, 1998.
 Munden, Kenneth White. The American Film Institute Catalog of Motion Pictures Produced in the United States, Part 1. University of California Press, 1997.

External links
 

1926 films
1920s action films
American silent feature films
American action films
Films directed by B. Reeves Eason
American black-and-white films
Gotham Pictures films
1920s English-language films
1920s American films
Silent action films